Temptation is a 1946 American film noir thriller film directed by Irving Pichel and starring Merle Oberon, George Brent, Charles Korvin and Paul Lukas. The film was based on Robert Smythe Hichens's 1909 novel Bella Donna. Other film adaptations of the novel were produced in 1915, 1923 and 1934.

Plot
In the 1890s, a London courtesan snares a loving but naive Egyptologist, marries him and moves to Egypt. She quickly becomes bored and embarks on an affair with Mamhoud Baroudi. She falls in love with him, and they plot to kill her husband.

Cast
 Merle Oberon as Ruby
 George Brent as Nigel Armine
 Charles Korvin as Mahoud Baroudi
 Paul Lukas as Sir Meyer Isaacson
 Lenore Ulric as Marie
 Arnold Moss as Ahmed Effendi
 Robert Capa as Hamza
 Aubrey Mather as Dr. Harding
 Ludwig Stössel as Dr. Mueller
 André Charlot as Prof. Dupont
 Suzanne Cloutier as Yvonne Dupont
 Gloria Lloyd as Jean McCormick

Production
The film was the first that Edward Small produced after the termination of his long contract with United Artists, and the first to be filmed at Universal under the merger with International Pictures that formed the short-lived United World Pictures. Small bought the rights to the novel in 1941, intending it as a vehicle for Ilona Massey, who had just appeared in International Lady for him. He wished to produce the film for United Artists, but other projects took priority. Over a five-year period, there were several near-starts and postponements. Small almost managed to begin production in February 1946, but there was not enough studio space.

Photographer Robert Capa made his sole acting appearance in Temptation. On a visit to the set to see his friend Charles Korvin, Capa claimed that he could perform the role of Hamza better than could the actor who had been hired to play the part. Capa auditioned for Irving Pichel, who was convinced by Capa's accent and offered him the part.

Reception
In a contemporary review for The New York Times, critic Bosley Crowther panned the film, writing: "True enough, Miss Oberon looks lovely, Mr. Korvin behaves with bold sang-froid and George Brent is sufficiently unimpressive to seem a husband that a dame would double-cross. Paul Lucas, Arnold Moss and Lenore Ulric also act as though they thought they had a script. But the whole thing is as claptrap in its nature as it was when Pola Negri played it back in 1923."

Variety magazine criticized the screenplay, writing: "Production is well-stacked with solid values in every department except for the screenplay, which falls short in its attempt to stretch an unsubstantial story line over so long a running time."

References

External links
 
 
 

1946 films
1940s thriller drama films
American thriller drama films
American black-and-white films
1940s English-language films
Film noir
Films directed by Irving Pichel
Universal Pictures films
Films set in Egypt
Films set in London
Films set in the 1890s
Films set in the 1900s
Films produced by Edward Small
1940s historical films
American historical films
Films scored by Daniele Amfitheatrof
Films based on British novels
Remakes of American films
1946 drama films
1940s American films